Frederick Cantrell Beach was a professional football player in the National Football League. He made his NFL debut in 1926 with the Los Angeles Buccaneers. He played only one season in the league.

References
Pro Football Archives: Fred Beach

1897 births
1981 deaths
California Golden Bears football players
Los Angeles Buccaneers players
People from Loma Linda, California